Acalymma is a genus of leaf beetles found mainly in the New World. Approximately 72 species have been described in the Western Hemisphere.

Pest Species and Impacts
In the United States, two species are major pests of cucurbits, the striped cucumber beetle (Acalymma vittatum), which is mainly found east of the Mississippi River, and Acalymma trivittatum which is mostly found west of the Mississippi. Adults feed on young leaves, and larvae can damage roots. A. vittatum vectors bacterial wilt Erwinia tracheiphila Holland (Enterobacteriales: Enterobacteriaceae) to the plants as it pierces plant stems to suck juices.

Species included
The genus includes the following species:
Acalymma albidovittatum (Baly, 1889) – cucumber beetle
Acalymma bechynei Cabrera, 1999
Acalymma bertoluccii Gilbert & Clark, 2007
Acalymma bivittulum (Kirsch, 1883) (Synonym: A. xanthographa Bechyné, 1955)
Acalymma blandulum (LeConte, 1868)
Acalymma blomorum Munroe & Smith, 1980
Acalymma bruchii (Bowditch, 1911)
Acalymma caucum Bechyné, 1956
Acalymma cornutum (Baly, 1886)
Acalymma cryptogrammum Bechyné & Bechyné, 1968
Acalymma fairmairei (Baly, 1886)
Acalymma flavovittatum (Baly, 1886)
Acalymma gouldi Barber, 1947
Acalymma hirtum
Acalymma horni (Jacoby, 1887)
Acalymma incum
Acalymma innubum (Fabricius, 1775)
Acalymma invenustum Munroe & Smith, 1980
Acalymma isogenum Bechyné & Bechyné, 1968
Acalymma longicolle (Jacoby, 1887)
Acalymma luridifrons Munroe & Smith, 1980
Acalymma obscurofasciatum (Jacoby, 1887)
Acalymma palomarense Munroe & Smith, 1980
Acalymma peregrinum (Jacoby, 1892)
Acalymma punctatum Bechyné, 1958
Acalymma semifemoratum (Gahan, 1891)
Acalymma solarianum Bechyné & Bechyné, 1962
Acalymma subaeneum
Acalymma thiemei
Acalymma trivittatum (Mannerheim, 1843) – western striped cucumber beetle
Acalymma vinctum (LeConte, 1878)
Acalymma vittatum (Fabricius, 1775) – striped cucumber beetle
Acalymma vittigerum (Boheman, 1859)

References

Galerucinae
Chrysomelidae genera
Agricultural pest insects
Taxa named by Herbert Spencer Barber